Ethmia hemicosma is a moth in the family Depressariidae. It is found in Kenya.

References

Endemic moths of Kenya
Moths described in 1920
hemicosma
Moths of Africa